Alibertia patinoi, commonly known as , is a small (2-5m), dioecious tropical rainforest tree, one of the few edible fruit bearing species in the Rubiaceae family. Borojó, native to the world's wettest lowlands (the Chocó–Darién moist forests ecoregion), grows in the Chocó Department of northwestern Colombia and in the Esmeraldas Province of northwestern Ecuador.
 
Borojó is an Emberá word meaning: boro = head, jo = fruit - head-shaped fruit, or round, globulous fruit. The species has also been reported from Panamá, Venezuela and Costa Rica.

Growth
Alibertia patinoi has grey-brown bark and sometimes has two or three smaller trunks as well as one main one. It needs high humidity (over 85%) and temperature (an average of at least 25 °C) to thrive, though it can tolerate brief frosts as well as floods.

Fruit
The fruit is large (about 12 cm in length), with a round shape and brown color and average weight of 740-1000 grams.  The pulp represents 88% of the total weight. Each fruit has 90 to 640 seeds. Borojo has high levels of protein, ascorbic acid, calcium and iron and very high levels of phosphorus.  Borojo is used in the preparation of jam, wine, desserts and traditional medicines with supposed aphrodisiac effects. It is also used by the local communities against hypertension, bronchial diseases and malnutrition. Borojo extract is widely sold on the internet as a health food.

A study commissioned at Rutgers University by Nutropical, a private company, found that borojo fruit powder had a high and significant content of polyphenols as measured by the Folin-Ciocalteu polyphenol test. Most notably, the researchers believe the key polyphenol found in borojo may be novel. Work continues to identify the compound and/or elucidate its chemical structure. An analysis conducted by the same company found borojo has an ORAC value of over 54 μmolTE/g (5400 µmolTE/100g). The form of the fruit tested, however, is not mentioned (fresh, freeze-dried, spray-dried, etc.). The purported aphrodisiac properties of the fruit have a molecular basis.

Cultivation
Around 3,000 hectares are used to cultivate borojo.

Related species
Alibertia sorbilis is a very similar species, also used with commercial purposes. Borojó de la Amazonia (Amazonas borojo), Duroia maguirei, is a wild species in a different Rubiaceae genus, which grows up to 8 m and has a smaller, edible fruit.   Claes Persson (1999)

References

Further reading

 Cuatrecasas, José 1948: "Borojoa, un nuevo género de Rubiáceas"; Revista de La Academia Colombiana de Ciencias Exactas Físicas y Naturales VII (28): 474-477. Bogotá.
 Cuatrecasas, José y Víctor Manuel Patiño 1949: Una nueva fruta tropical americana: el borojó. Secretaría de Agricultura y Ganadería. Servicio de Divulgación. Serie Botánica Aplicada. Año II. N°. 5. Cali. Imprenta Departamental.
 Persson, Claes 2000: "Phylogeny of the Neotropical Alibertia group (Rubiaceae), with emphasis on the genus Alibertia, inferred from ITS and 5S ribosomal DNA sequences"; American Journal of Botany 87:1018-1028.
 Robbrecht, E., and C. Puff. 1986: "A survey of the Gardenieae and related tribes (Rubiaceae)"; Botanische Jahrbücher für Systematik, Pflanzengeschichte und Pflanzengeographie 108: 63–137.
 Schumann, K. 1891: "Rubiaceae"; Die natürlichen Pflanzenfamilien 4(4): 1–154; A. Engler and K. Prantl [eds.],  Engelmann, Leipzig, Germany.

Cordiereae
Agriculture in Colombia
Crops
Flora of Colombia
Flora of Panama
Flora of Ecuador
Flora of Costa Rica
Plants described in 2011
Tropical fruit